Providence Care is a teaching hospital affiliated with Queen's University located in Kingston, Ontario that was built in 1861. Providence Care is a not-for-profit organization governed by a volunteer Board of Directors and sponsored by the Catholic Health Corporation of Ontario. The Worship Centre overlooks Lake Ontario and was designed with input from faith leaders from the Kingston, Ontario community. Providence Care has 585 patient beds. Providence Care is a partner within Kingston's University hospitals in the Southeast LHIN, delivering health care, conducting research and training health care professionals.

History
Providence Care was founded in 1861 by the Sisters of Providence of St. Vincent de Paul to meet the physical, emotional, social and spiritual needs of its patients with respect, dignity and compassion.

The centre has three sites. The budget and range of programs and services are a result of government-directed OHIP hospital restructuring that consolidated rehabilitation programs, specialized mental health services, and forensics at the Providence Care Corporation.

Sites

Providence Manor
Providence Manor is a 243-bed long-term care home, located in downtown Kingston. It is where, in 1861, the Sisters of Providence of St. Vincent de Paul first began their mission. Providence Manor has a secure Alzheimer unit with two beds for short stays. The Hildegarde Centre and Adult Day Away program provide a variety of recreational, physical, social and spiritual activities in a structured setting, offering respite to clients and their caregivers during times of need.

Mental Health Services

Providence Care's Mental Health Services site is a 198-bed facility that provides specialized services to adults in southeastern Ontario with all forms of serious mental illness. Providence Care Mental Health Services is a teaching hospital, providing treatment through three clinical program areas: Adult Treatment and Rehabilitation, Geriatric Psychiatry and Forensic Psychiatry.
The Mental Health Services originally started in 1862 with the building of the Rockwood Asylum for the Insane. The asylum is a large 4 story limestone building constructed with using convict labour from the nearby Kingston Penitentiary. This building still exists today, although closed to the public. The building was sold to the provincial government in 1877 and used til 1975. In 1957 a new hospital called Westwood, was built on the same grounds of the then called the Ontario Hospital Kingston. In the late 1960s it was renamed the Kingston Psychiatric Hospital until the Ontario government divested the hospital to the Providence Care group.

St. Mary's of the Lake Hospital
St. Mary's of the Lake Hospital provides non-acute chronic health care for people living in southeastern Ontario. Established in 1946, it is a teaching hospital specializing in rehabilitation, specialized geriatric services, complex continuing care and palliative care. St. Mary's of the Lake hospital has 144 beds: 72 complex continuing care, 6 palliative care, 46 rehabilitation, 16 geriatric medicine, and 4 respite care beds.

Providence Care Hospital
Providence Care Hospital is a 270-bed facility built on the same property as the former Mental Health Services building.

See also

Kingston General Hospital
Hotel Dieu Hospital

External links 

Providence Care homepage

Hospitals in Ontario
Queen's University at Kingston
Teaching hospitals in Canada
Buildings and structures in Kingston, Ontario
Hospitals established in 1861
Nursing homes in Canada
1861 establishments in Canada
Public–private partnership projects in Canada
Catholic hospitals in North America
Psychiatric hospitals in Ontario